A pineapple bun is a kind of sweet bun predominantly popular in Hong Kong and also common in Chinatowns worldwide. Despite the name, it does not traditionally contain pineapple; rather, the name refers to the look of the characteristic topping (which resembles the texture of a pineapple).

History

Tai Tung Bakery is one of the oldest family-run bakeries in Hong Kong, making about 1,000 pineapple buns daily since 1943.

In June 2014, the Hong Kong Government listed the pineapple bun as a part of Hong Kong's intangible cultural heritage. Tai Tung Bakery in Yuen Long, which had been making pineapple buns for more than 70 years, was a key proponent of including the technique for making the buns on the list of 480 items of living heritage.

Composition
The top of the pineapple bun (the part which is made to resemble a pineapple) is made of a dough similar to that used to make sugar cookies, which consists of sugar, eggs, flour, and lard. It is crunchy and is quite sweet compared to the bread underneath. The bread dough underneath is that which is used in Hong Kong–style breads, which is a softer and sweeter dough than in European breads. It is popular at breakfast or afternoon tea.

Although it is known as a "pineapple bun", the traditional version contains no pineapple. The name originated from the fact that its sugary top crust is cooked to a golden-brown colour, and because its checkered top resembles the skin of a pineapple.

Buttered variant

Many Hong Kong restaurants, such as cha chaan tengs and dai pai dongs, offer an item called a buttered pineapple bun, which is a pineapple bun with a slice of butter stuffed inside. They are known in Cantonese as boh loh yau (菠蘿油), in which boh loh means "pineapple", and yau (oil) refers to butter. Variants of this include using custard in place of butter.

Typically the bun is brought hot from the oven to the diner's table, and served halved with a large slab of butter in between the halves.

Other common variants
The pineapple bun may come in miniature sizes (迷你菠蘿包), it may be used as a bread roll for sandwiches with luncheon meat (餐肉菠蘿包), or it may be pre-stuffed with red bean paste (紅豆菠蘿包), custard cream (奶黃菠蘿包), barbecued pork (叉燒菠蘿包), or a sweet filling of shredded coconut (椰絲菠蘿包) like that in a cocktail bun. It is possible to order a "pineapple pineapple bun", actually stuffed with pineapple (菠蘿菠蘿包).

Japanese melonpan and Korean soboro bread are variants that use the same ingredients for a German streusel-like texture on top but without resemblance to a pineapple.

Controversy
In September 2014, a police raid in Hong Kong found that, unwittingly, several suppliers (including Starbucks, 7-Eleven and Cafe Express) had been selling pineapple buns made with tainted oil, known as "gutter oil", from an unlicensed factory in Taiwan. This oil was recycled from kitchen waste, as well as being a by-product of leather processing and offal from slaughterhouses.

In October 2020, a Japanese bakery c'est très fou launched the product "Taiwanese pineapple bun", which received criticism for suggesting the product originated in Taiwan, though the bakery's introduction of the product had correctly mentioned that the bun originated in Hong Kong.

See also

Bun
List of buns
Concha (bread), the Mexican equivalent of pineapple bun
Melonpan, the Japanese equivalent of pineapple bun

References

External links

Dim sum
Sweet breads
Macanese cuisine
Buns
Hong Kong breads
Stuffed dishes